The 2015–16 Shakhtar Donetsk season is the clubs twenty-fifth season.

Squad

Out on loan

Transfers

In

Out

Loans out

Released

Friendlies

Competitions

Overall

Super Cup

Premier League

League table

Results summary

Results by round

Results

Ukrainian Cup

UEFA Champions League

Qualifying round

Group stage

UEFA Europa League

Knockout phase

Squad statistics

Appearances and goals

|-
|colspan="14"|Players who left Shakhtar Donetsk during the season:

|}

Goalscorers

Clean sheets

Disciplinary record

Notes

References

External links 
Official website

Shakhtar Donetsk season
FC Shakhtar Donetsk seasons
Shakhtar Donetsk